The 12401 / 12402 Nanda Devi AC Express train belonging to Indian Railways that runs between  &  in India. It is a daily service. It operates as train number 12401 from Kota Junction to Dehradun and as train number 12402 in the reverse direction. At first it ran between  & Dehradun as train number 12205 & 12206. Since 26 August 2019 it was extended up to Kota Junction, skipping New Delhi.

Coaches

The 12401/12402 Nanda Devi AC Express has 2 AC First Class, 4 AC Two Tier, 7 AC Three Tier coaches along with 2 End on generation cars. As with most train services in India, coach composition may be amended at the discretion of Indian Railways depending on demand.

EOG || B7 || B6 || B5 || B4 || B3 || B2 || B1 || A4 || A3 || A2 || A1 || H2 || H1 || EOG

Service

It is a daily train & covers the distance of 763 kilometres in 11 hours 45 minutes as 12401 Nanda Devi AC Express (65  km/hr)and in 11 hours 45 minutes as 12402 Nanda Devi AC Express (65  km/hr). It has a Superfast surcharge.

Route & halts
 to Dehradun.

Traction

It is hauled from end to end by a WAP-7 (HOG)-equipped locomotive from the Tughlakabad Loco Shed.

Operation

 12401 Nanda Devi AC Express leaves Kota Junction on a daily basis at 17:55 hrs  and reaches Dehradun the next day at 05:40 hrs.
 12402 Nanda Devi AC Express leaves Dehradun on a daily basis at 22:50 hrs  and reaches Kota Junction the next day at 10:35 hrs.
Before that, it used to run between Dehradun & New Delhi as 12205/12206.

Gallery

External links
Dehradun AC Express

AC Express (Indian Railways) trains
Trains from Dehradun
Rail transport in Delhi